Psusennes is the Greek form of the ancient Egyptian name Pasebakhaenniut (p3-sb3-ḫˁỉ-n-nỉwt, "The star appearing in the city (=Thebes)". There are three major figures of that name:

Two 21st Dynasty pharaohs:
 Psusennes I
 Psusennes II

and a 21st dynasty High Priest of Amun, who may be the same person as Psusennes II:
 Psusennes III

Ancient Egyptian given names